Norpethidine (normeperidine, pethidine intermediate B) is a 4-phenylpiperidine derivative that is both a precursor to, and the toxic metabolite of, pethidine (meperidine). It is scheduled by UN Single Convention on Narcotic Drugs. It is a Schedule II Narcotic controlled substance in the United States and has an ACSCN of 9233.

Norpethidine is a controlled drug because of its potential uses in manufacturing both pethidine itself and a range of N-substituted derivatives, but it has little opioid activity in its own right. Instead, norpethidine acts as a stimulant and causes convulsions.  
 
Bioaccumulation of norpethidine is a major complication when pethidine is used in medicine as an analgesic, as when pethidine is used in high doses or administered by intravenous infusion, norpethidine can accumulate in the body at a faster rate than it is being excreted, particularly in elderly patients or those with compromised liver or kidney function, resulting in a range of toxic effects, mainly convulsions, but also myoclonus and hyponatremia. These complications can be serious and have sometimes resulted in death.

Metabolism of pethidine to norpethidine is carried out mainly by the CYP enzymes, CYP2B6, CYP2C19 and CYP3A4, in the liver, and since the activity of these enzymes can vary between individuals and can be influenced by concurrent use of other drugs, the rate and extent of norpethidine production can be difficult to predict.

Norpethidine can be used as a precursor in synthesis of other drugs, including etoxeridine, benzethidine, furethidine, morpheridine, anileridine, phenoperidine, piminodine and oxpheneridine.

See also
 Nortilidine
 O-Desmethyltramadol
 Moramide intermediate
 Methadone intermediate
 Pethidine intermediate A
 Pethidine intermediate C (pethidinic acid)

References

Convulsants
Synthetic opioids
Opioid metabolites
4-Phenylpiperidines
Carboxylate esters
Ethyl esters
Human drug metabolites
Serotonin–norepinephrine–dopamine reuptake inhibitors